The Snow Leopards Astana, Also known As Snezhnye Barsy, is a Professional ice hockey team from Astana. They compete in the Kazakhstan Hockey Championship.

Season-by-season record
Note: GP = Games played, W = Wins, L = Losses, OTW = Overtime/shootout wins, OTL = Overtime/shootout losses, Pts = Points, GF = Goals for, GA = Goals against

Head coaches
Galym Mambetaliyev 2011–12
Stanislav Frolov 2012–13
Galym Mambetaliyev 2013–2017
Sergei Starygin 2017–2020
Alexander Istomin 2020–

References

External links
Official page

2011 establishments in Kazakhstan
Ice hockey clubs established in 2011
Ice hockey teams in Astana
Junior Hockey League (Russia) teams